The 1997 Hong Kong Women's Sevens was the first Hong Kong Women's Sevens to be held. It took place on 15–16 March 1997.

Pool stages

Pool A

Pool B

Knockout stage

Bowl

Plate

Cup

References

External links

1997
1997 rugby sevens competitions
1997 in women's rugby union
Rugby union
1997 in Asian rugby union